When False Tongues Speak is a 1917 American silent drama film directed by Carl Harbaugh and starring Virginia Pearson, Hardee Kirkland and Claire Whitney.

Cast
 Virginia Pearson as Mary Page Walton 
 Carl Harbaugh as Fred Walton 
 Hardee Kirkland as Platt Sinclair 
 Claire Whitney as Helen Lee
 William E. Meehan as Jimmy Hope 
 Carl Eckstrom as Eric Mann

References

Bibliography
 Solomon, Aubrey. The Fox Film Corporation, 1915-1935: A History and Filmography. McFarland, 2011.

External links
 

1917 films
1917 drama films
1910s English-language films
American silent feature films
Silent American drama films
American black-and-white films
Films directed by Carl Harbaugh
Fox Film films
1910s American films